Aditya Prakash (born 7 September 1990) is an Indian badminton player who currently plays singles. He was part of the national team that won the gold medal at the 2010 South Asian Games in Dhaka, Bangladesh. He competed at the 2008 Commonwealth Youth Games in Pune, won the gold medal in the team event and the silver medal in the boys' singles.

References

External links 
 

Living people
1990 births
Racket sportspeople from Karnataka
Indian male badminton players
South Asian Games gold medalists for India
South Asian Games medalists in badminton